Muheza is a town in the Tanga Region of Tanzania. It is the capital of Muheza District, Tanga Region.

Transport
Paved trunk road T13 from Segera to the Kenyan border passes through Muheza town. The town also has a station on the Tanga-Arusha Railway.

References

Populated places in Tanga Region